Conclusion is an album by the U.K punk rock band Conflict. It was recorded in Alaska and released in December 1993 by Mortarhate Records. The album was among their most high profile and successful releases.

Track listing
"To Live On In Hearts" – 1:41
"The Right To Reply" – 5:31
"Someday Soon" – 2:09
"No More Excuses" – 2:59
"A Declaration Of Independence" – 6:34
"The Institute Of Dreams" – 3:44
"Climbing The Stairs" – 4:47
"A Question Of Priorities" – 9:41
"Is Never To Die" – 4:43

Conflict (band) albums
1993 albums